Fissel Arrondissement  is an arrondissement of the M'bour Department in the Thiès Region of Senegal.  The arrondissement is divided administratively into rural communities, and in turn into villages.

Arrondissements of Senegal
Thiès Region